Las Vegas Airport  is an airport  east of Río Dulce, a village in Izabal Department, Guatemala.

The airport is on the east side of the Dulce River, which connects Lake Izabal and Lake El Golfete. No main roads connect the airport with the town, but it has good access from the river. West approach and departure are over the water.

The village and lakes are a popular vacation and retirement location.

See also
 
 
 Transport in Guatemala
 List of airports in Guatemala

References

External links
 OpenStreetMap - Las Vegas Airport
 OurAirports - Las Vegas
 FallingRain - Las Vegas Airport
 

Airports in Guatemala
Izabal Department